The Goin' Coastal Tour was the a co-headlining concert tour by American country music arts Kenny Chesney and the Zac Brown Band. It was in support of Chesney's thirteenth studio album Hemingway's Whiskey (2010) and The Zac Brown Band's sophomore album You Get What You Give (2010). It was announced in November 2010, with nine stadium shows being announced first. An additional forty-one were announced two months later. Chesney co-headlined the stadium shows with Zac Brown Band. Billy Currington and Uncle Kracker served as opening acts. This was the Chesney's last tour before taking a two-year hiatus.

Background
Chesney told USA Today, "We are excited to feel the passion and the energy that the fans give us again", "There's a realsense of anticipation that our whole organization has about getting back on the road and playing some of our favorite stadiums and some new ones too, like Arrowhead and Lambeau Field where they haven't had a concert in over 20 years. We can't wait!"

Opening acts
Zac Brown Band 
Billy Currington
Uncle Kracker

Setlist
"Live a Little"
"Reality"
"Live Those Songs"
"Summertime"
"Beer in Mexico"
"Coastal"
"The Woman with You"
"Big Star"
"I Go Back"
"No Shoes, No Shirt, No Problem" 		
"Anything but Mine"	
"The Life"	
"There Goes My Life"	
"Three Little Birds" (Bob Marley and the Wailers cover)
"Living in Fast Forward" 		
"Young" 		
"Somewhere with You" 		
"Don't Happen Twice"	
"Everybody Wants to Go to Heaven"	
"The Good Stuff"	
"Never Wanted Nothing More"	
"When the Sun Goes Down" 
"You Never Even Call Me By My Name" 		
"How Forever Feels"		
"She Thinks My Tractor's Sexy"
Encore 		
"The Boys of Fall"

Tour dates

Notes
 This was during the 2011 Men's Division I Final Four. 
 This concert was a part of the Stagecoach Festival
 This concert was a part of the Calgary Stampede

Accolades
The tour was ranked sixth for the Top 25 Tours of 2011. It went on to gross $84,576,917, a total attendance of 1,160,132, and had 37 sold out shows.

References

2011 concert tours
Co-headlining concert tours
Kenny Chesney concert tours
Zac Brown Band concert tours